Bergstedt is a surname. Notable people with the surname include:

Hannah Bergstedt (born 1977), Swedish politician
Harald Bergstedt (1877–1965), Danish writer, novelist, playwright, and poet
John Bergstedt (born 1969), Swedish ski mountaineer
Ragnar Bergstedt (1889–1987), Swedish rower